The Rolling Stones' 1965 2nd Irish Tour was a concert tour by the band. The tour commenced on September 3 and concluded on September 4, 1965.

This concert tour was documented by the documentary film Charlie Is My Darling.

The Rolling Stones
Mick Jagger - lead vocals, harmonica, percussion
Keith Richards - guitar, backing vocals
Brian Jones - guitar, harmonica, backing vocals
Bill Wyman - bass guitar, backing vocals
Charlie Watts - drums

Tour set list
Songs performed include:
Everybody Needs Somebody To Love
Pain In My Heart
Around and Around
Time Is On My Side
I'm Moving On
The Last Time
(I Can't Get No) Satisfaction
I'm Alright

Tour dates

References
The Complete Works of the Rolling Stones in 1965, German database link
 Carr, Roy.  The Rolling Stones: An Illustrated Record.  Harmony Books, 1976.  

The Rolling Stones concert tours
1965 concert tours
1965 in Ireland
Concert tours of Ireland